Umayalpuram is a village in the Papanasam taluk of Thanjavur district in the Indian state of Tamil Nadu.

Demographics 

As per the 2001 census, Umayalpuram had a population of 4697, including 2383 males and 2314 females for a sex ratio of 971. The literacy rate was 76.72.

Geography 

This village is on the Kumbakonam to Thiruvaiyaru route. It is 12 km from Kumbakonam. It is located near the Cauvery river. Umayalpuram is a plain in the Cauvery delta. Several endemic birds are found there. Peafowls, Ashy Prinia, Tawny flanked prinia, red-vented Bulbul, white browed Bulbul, oriental Magpie Robin, Bushchat, munia, mynah etc., are found there.

Economy 
The major crops are rice, sugar cane, cotton, and banana.

Education 

The village hosts a high school, which is more than 120 years old, Bharathy nursery and primary school, and a Government primary school.

Notables 

 Umayalpuram K. Sivaraman, a mridangam player, was born in the village.

References 

 

Villages in Thanjavur district